Richard Niederbacher (born 7 December 1961) is an Austrian former professional football player and coach.

Club career
Niederbacher played for Strum Graz, SV Waregem, Paris Saint-Germain, Stade Reims, First Vienna, Rapid Wien, Vorwärts Steyr, LASK Linz, Pécsi Mecsek and DSV Leoben.
In September 2009 he took over the Head Coaching Position from Dejan Stankovic at the Austrian Regional League Club (Regionalliga Mitte, 3rd Austrian League) DSV Leoben. After financial troubles at the club he left in Summer 2010 to take on a Job as a Coaching Assistant in his hometown Gleisdorf.

International career
He also played 4 times for the Austrian national side.

External links

Player profile - Weltfußball  
Player profile - RapidArchiv 

1961 births
Living people
People from Gleisdorf
Austrian footballers
Austria international footballers
SK Sturm Graz players
K.S.V. Waregem players
Paris Saint-Germain F.C. players
Stade de Reims players
First Vienna FC players
SK Rapid Wien players
SK Vorwärts Steyr players
DSV Leoben players
Austrian Football Bundesliga players
Belgian Pro League players
Ligue 1 players
Ligue 2 players
Austrian expatriate footballers
Expatriate footballers in Belgium
Expatriate footballers in France
Expatriate footballers in Hungary
Austrian football managers
DSV Leoben managers
Association football forwards
Footballers from Styria